Baseline Road is a major east-west street in Boulder, Colorado that extends east of the city through parts of four counties. The western terminus of Baseline Road is at Flagstaff Mountain in the City of Boulder Mountain Parks. Baseline Road runs almost exactly along the 40th line of latitude.

Origin of the name
On May 30, 1854, the Kansas-Nebraska Act created the Kansas Territory and the Nebraska Territory, divided by the 40th parallel north.  The Pike's Peak Gold Rush of 1858-1861 lured thousands of gold seekers into the goldfields of the northwestern Kansas Territory and the southwestern Nebraska Territory.  On February 28, 1861, the western portion of the Kansas Territory and the southwestern portion of the Nebraska Territory were incorporated into the new Colorado Territory.  The 40th parallel became the primary baseline for surveying the land in the eastern portion of the new territory, and a road was eventually cut along the survey baseline.

Official names for the road
The road along the 40th parallel is officially named Baseline Road in Boulder County and the City and County of Broomfield, 168th Avenue in Adams County, and County Line Road or Weld County Road 2 in Weld County.

A  stretch of Baseline Road, from US 287 in Lafayette to I-25 in Broomfield, is part of State Highway 7.

Description
Baseline Road descends from Flagstaff Mountain (site of the 1935 CCC Sunrise Amphitheatre) and runs through the city of Boulder for its first four miles (6 km).  Within Boulder, it passes the Colorado Chautauqua, a National Historic Landmark, near 9th Street; crosses State Highway 93 (Broadway); then passes the University of Colorado Law School just east of Broadway.  The road then crosses US 36 (28th Street), passes the Williams Village dormitory towers of the University of Colorado, and crosses State Highway 157 (Foothills Parkway).  East of 55th Street, the road seems to terminate at Cherryvale Road.  It actually continues, shifted slightly to the north, following a small northbound stretch of Cherryvale.  Thereafter, the road leaves the city of Boulder and takes on a more rural character until approaching State Highway 42 (95th Street).  At that point the more urban surroundings of Lafayette are evident, and the next two miles (3 km) run through the heart of Lafayette, including the road junction with US 287 (N. 107th St.). 

About one mile (1.6 km) beyond the eastern city limits of Lafayette, the road crosses the eastern boundary of Boulder County and passes the Erie Municipal Airport.  For two miles (3 km) beyond this point, Baseline Road forms the boundary between Weld County and the City and County of Broomfield.  For the next two miles (3 km), from Sheridan Parkway to the interchange with I-25, the road passes through a rural northern portion of the City and County of Broomfield. 

Just east of I-25, the road abuts a commercial area in the extreme northern part of the city of Thornton.  For the next mile, from this point to York Street, Baseline Road marks the boundary between Adams County and the City and County of Broomfield.  From York Street east, the road forms the boundary between Adams County and Weld County for the remainder of its length.

Baseline Road passes through the northern part of Brighton for about five miles (8 km), eventually reaching the town of Lochbuie and the interchange with I-76. Beyond I-76 the road once again takes on a rural character and continues to its eastern terminus at 16800 Watkins Road.

Counties
 Boulder County
 City and County of Broomfield
 Weld County (south boundary)
 Adams County (north boundary)

Cities and towns
 Boulder
 Lafayette
 Erie (south boundary)
 Broomfield
 Thornton
 Brighton
 Lochbuie (south boundary)

Highway junctions
 State Highway 93 (Broadway) in Boulder
 US 36 (28th Street) in Boulder
 State Highway 157 (Foothills Parkway) in Boulder
 State Highway 42 (95th Street) in Lafayette
 US 287 (N. 107th St.) in Lafayette
 State Highway 7 from Lafayette to Broomfield (same roadway for 7 miles)
 I-25 in northern Broomfield
 US 85 in Brighton
 I-76 in Lochbuie

Termini
Western terminus: 
Eastern terminus:

External links
 pictures of The Colorado Chautauqua and Sunrise Amphitheatre
 map: western terminus, Flagstaff Mountain
 map: Erie Municipal Airport
 map: I-25 interchange
 map: eastern terminus, 16800 Watkins Road

Streets in Colorado
Boulder, Colorado
Transportation in Boulder County, Colorado
Transportation in Broomfield, Colorado
Transportation in Adams County, Colorado
Transportation in Weld County, Colorado